Aq Qui (also Romanized as Āq Qū'ī and Āgh Qū’ī) is a village in Akhtarabad Rural District, in the Central District of Malard County, Tehran Province, Iran. At the 2006 census, its population was 21, in 5 families.

References 

Populated places in Malard County